Disallowance and reservation are historical constitutional powers that were instituted in several territories throughout the British Empire as a mechanism to delay or overrule legislation. Originally created to preserve the Crown's authority over colonial governments, these powers are now generally considered politically obsolete, and in many cases have been formally abolished.

General principles
In British Commonwealth and colonial territories, the legislature is typically composed of one or two legislative chambers, together with the governor-general (or colonial governor) acting in the name of the sovereign. Once a bill has passed through the chambers, it is presented to the governor-general for assent on the Sovereign's behalf. The governor-general was formally instructed (or required by the constitution or by statute) in certain circumstances to reserve a bill for the sovereign's "pleasure". That is, the governor-general would neither assent nor refuse assent to the bill, but would instead refer it to the secretary of state for the colonies in the United Kingdom for consideration by the British government; assent, if then given, would be by the King- (or Queen-) in-Council.

A bill assented to by a governor-general or colonial governor would pass into law, but might still be disallowed by the King- or Queen-in-Council, usually within a certain timeframe after its passage. Once notice of the disallowance was communicated to the colonial authorities, the act in question would cease to operate as law. Disallowance was not retroactive, so anything validly done under an act's terms before its disallowance remained legal.

Sometimes a bill that had passed into law might be suspended by its own terms until the sovereign's pleasure was made known, i.e. until the British government had advised the colonial authorities whether they were prepared to accept the legislation. Approval, if given, would again be by the King- or Queen-in-Council.

All three methods were originally used to ensure that legislation was not repugnant to English law, that it did not exceed a legislature's formal competence, that it did not interfere with the British government's imperial or foreign policies, and even simply that the British government did not disagree with the legislation.

The use of these powers declined over the course of the nineteenth century, in particular because of the abolition of the doctrine of general repugnancy by the Colonial Laws Validity Act 1865 and because the British government began to leave it to the court system to rule on the vires of colonial legislation. With the development of responsible government, the use of these powers declined even more rapidly.  The 1926 imperial conference approved a committee report that stated:
[A]part from provisions embodied in constitutions or in specific statutes expressly providing for reservation, it is recognised that it is the right of the Government of each Dominion to advise the Crown in all matters relating to its own affairs.  Consequently, it would not be in accordance with constitutional practice for advice to be tendered to His Majesty by His Majesty's Government in Great Britain in any matter appertaining to the affairs of a Dominion against the views of the Government of that Dominion.
The Report of the Conference on the Operation of Dominion Legislation and Merchant Shipping Legislation, 1929 (Cmd 3479), which was approved by the 1930 imperial conference, stated that both the prerogative and statutory powers of disallowance had "not been exercised for many years" in relation to dominion legislation (para. 19), and more specifically:
In fact the power of disallowance has not been exercised in relation to Canadian legislation since 1873 or to New Zealand legislation since 1867; it has never been exercised in relation to legislation passed by the Parliaments of the Commonwealth of Australia or the Union of South Africa. (para. 22)

Together with the change from the appointment of governors-general being made on the formal advice of the British government to being made on the advice of the relevant dominion government, the effect of these two conferences was to put an end to the use of both reservation and disallowance as meaningful powers. Later Commonwealth realms, given independence in the 1950s onwards, simply did not include reservation and disallowance in their constitutions in the first place.

In Australia

The powers of disallowance and reservation still exist at the federal level in Australia, and are described in sections 58 to 60 of the Australian Constitution. Section 58 gives the governor-general an additional power, that of returning a bill to Parliament with suggested amendments. Section 74 provided that laws containing limitations on appeal to the Privy Council had to be reserved for the queen's assent.  Once the governor-general has assented to a law, the queen has one year in which to disallow it. If the governor-general reserves a bill for the queen's assent, the bill will die unless the queen approves it within two years of its passage. However, the power of disallowance has never been used in relation to Australian federal legislation, and reservation has likewise been rare to nonexistent.

There were similar arrangements in at least some Australian states, whose constitutional arrangements predated Australian federation by years or decades. Unlike in Canada (see below), disallowance of state laws, and reservation by state Governors, were matters directly for the Imperial government – the Australian federal government was never given the power to block state laws. Use of disallowance and reservation in the states declined and eventually ceased, and both powers were formally abolished by the Australia Act 1986.

In Canada

In Canadian constitutional law, the powers of reservation and disallowance of federal legislation still formally remain in place in Sections 55 and 56 of the Constitution Act, 1867. These are extended to provincial legislation by Section 90. In initial intent, and in practice for the first few years of Confederation, disallowance was considered a means of ensuring constitutional compliance.

For federal bills, reservation was done on the instructions of the United Kingdom until 1878. At the 1930 Imperial Conference, it was agreed that the United Kingdom would not reserve or disallow legislation without the approval of the Canadian cabinet. Between 1867 and 1878, twenty-one federal bills were reserved, six of which were denied Royal Assent. The only disallowed federal bill was the Oaths Act in 1873, which sought to enable Parliament to call witnesses for examination regarding the Pacific Scandal; the bill was deemed to be outside the power of the Federal parliament as envisioned in the British North America Act.

Reservation and disallowance are made applicable to the provincial bills in Section 90 of the Constitution Act, 1867, with the substitution of the Governor General of Canada for the Queen-in-Council and the lieutenant governor for the governor general. Prime Minister John A. Macdonald and his Conservative successors regularly advised disallowance for provincial legislation, generally citing respect for private contracts, preservation of federal jurisdiction, and the rights of local minorities as justification. Macdonald disallowed 13 railway charters issued by the fledgling provincial government of Manitoba. The election of the Liberals under Wilfrid Laurier in 1896, who regarded both reservation and disallowance as unwarranted interference in provincial affairs, began to see the use of the powers subside.  Provincial governments had gained democratic legitimacy and disputes regarding division of powers were decided via judicial review, leaving Liberals such as Oliver Mowat to believe the only motive for using the power was political interference. By 1911 the practice of disallowing provincial bills had become very infrequent. A notable use of disallowance in the 20th century was its use by federal Justice Minister Ernest Lapointe in the 1930s and 1940s to strike down various laws of Alberta's Social Credit government, which tried to legislate in the clearly defined federal powers of banking and currency.

The last disallowance of a provincial law occurred in April 1943, in relation to Alberta legislation restricting land sales regarding Hutterites and "enemy aliens." The last reservation of a provincial law occurred in 1961, when Saskatchewan Lieutenant Governor Frank Lindsay Bastedo, without the instruction or knowledge of the federal government, reserved a CCF government's bill regarding mining contracts. The Diefenbaker Cabinet quickly passed an order-in-council to grant royal assent.

Both powers, while still operative, are generally considered dormant, prompting some debates about whether they have effectively become obsolete through disuse. Comparative public law scholar Richard Albert has argued that both powers have fallen into "constitutional desuetude," which occurs "when an entrenched constitutional provision loses its binding force upon political actors as a result of its conscious sustained nonuse and public repudiation by preceding and present political actors."

Removal of both powers from the constitution was contemplated in the failed Victoria Charter.  The first ministers decided not to include abolition in the Constitution Act, 1982, and attempts to revise the powers included in the Charlottetown Accord failed at referendum.

Consideration of disallowance and reservation after 1961

The government of Pierre Trudeau faced public pressure to disallow Quebec's Charter of the French Language in 1977, which forbade the use of English language signs and openly contravened some procedural linguistic rights protected by the British North America Act.  Trudeau, a constitutional scholar, demurred, believing that disallowance would ultimately cause more political harm, and that it was better to have the conflicting matters adjudicated. Trudeau believed that disallowance was warranted only for laws that clearly violated federal power or that created disorder beyond the boundaries of the province enacting the law.

In 2018, the government of Justin Trudeau was formally asked by Toronto City Council to disallow Ontario's pending Efficient Local Government Act (Bill 31), a bill intended to force the reduction of the number of wards represented in the Toronto City Council after the government's previous attempt to do so was ruled unconstitutional by the Superior Court of Justice. Trudeau said he did not intend to intervene in the matter. The Legislative Assembly dropped Bill 31 when the Ontario Court of Appeal overturned the initial ruling of the Superior Court.

In 2019, the Alberta Leader of the Opposition wrote an open letter to the Lieutenant Governor of Alberta asking her to reserve royal assent on the Reform of Agencies, Boards and Commissions and Government Enterprises Act, 2019. The Lieutenant Governor declined.

In New Zealand

Disallowance and reservation were powers granted to the imperial government and the governor respectively in the New Zealand Constitution Act 1852. They were at first used relatively frequently, but as in other self-governing colonies the practice of overruling local legislation soon stopped. The current Constitution Act, passed in 1986 to replace the 1852 Act, makes no mention of either power.

See also
legislatively-referred referendum and abrogative referendum, powers analogous to Reservation and Disallowance in a constitutional theory based on popular sovereignty, rather than sovereignty of the Crown.
Canadian federalism
Manitoba Schools Question
New Zealand Constitution Act 1852 § Effect

References

Bibliography

 Gerard La Forest, "Disallowance and Reservation of Provincial Legislation" (Ottawa: Department of Justice, 1955).
Gerard V. La Forest, "Delegation of Legislative Power in Canada" in McGill Law Journal.

Constitution of Canada
Federalism in Canada
British Empire
Westminster system
Constitution of New Zealand